The Courthouse Towers is a collection of tall stone columns located in Arches National Park.

References

External links

Landforms of Grand County, Utah
Arches National Park
Rock formations of Utah